Suhasini Joshi (born 12 July 1947), popularly known by her screen name Suhas Joshi, is a Marathi theater, film and television actress. She is also seen in many Bollywood films. She was awarded the Sangeet Natak Akademi Award for 2018 for Acting. She is better known for her role in Mumbai-Pune-Mumbai 2 and Mumbai-Pune-Mumbai 3 as Swapnil Joshi's grandmother. She is currently portraying the role of Shilpa Tulaskar's mother-in-law in Zee Marathi's Tu Tevha Tashi.

Career
Joshi was attracted to the field of acting from her college days where she acted in few plays. Noticing her interest in it, she did a 3-year diploma course in acting from National School of Drama, Delhi where she was trained by noted theater director Ebrahim Alkazi.

Joshi started her career in 1972 with the Marathi play Barrister. Directed by Vijaya Mehta, the play was written by Jaywant Dalvi based on his previously published novel Andharachya Parambya. Joshi played the role of Radha in this play where the lead title role of Barrister was played by Vikram Gokhale. Later on, Joshi starred in various other plays. Her notable plays include Sai Paranjpye's Sakkhe Shejari and Vijay Tendulkar's Kanyadaan. Her role in Kanyadaan was opposite veteran actor Dr. Shriram Lagoo. The play was produced by the Marathi unit of the organization Indian National Theatre. Directed by Sadashiv Amrapurkar, who also played a role in the play, the drama performed more than 200 shows. Later, Joshi co-starred with Lagoo on various plays like Agnipankha, Natasamraat and Ekach Pyaala.

Joshi also performed the Monologue play Smriti Chitre which is based on the autobiography of Lakshmibai Tilak, wife of Reverend Narayan Waman Tilak. The play follows Lakshmibai's journey from a Hindu-Brahmin woman to her adopting Christianity in her husband's footsteps. The autobiography is considered as one of the masterpieces of Marathi literature and has also been translated to English as "I Follow After". Being a monologue, Joshi has worked out 3-4 different voices, including that of males. The play had previously been played by Kusumtai.

Joshi has also worked in various Bollywood film. Some of her notable works were in commercially successful film like Tezaab (1988), Chandni (1989) and Josh (2000). She has also acted in Marathi films like Tu Tithe Mee (1998) and Saatchya Aat Gharat (2004). For her work in Tu Tithe Mee, Joshi has received various awards and has been widely appreciated. Produced by Smita Talwalkar and directed by Sanjay Surkar, the film was adjudged as the Best Feature Film in Marathi at the 46th National Film Awards. In their official citation, the jury also appreciated Joshi's and her co-star Mohan Joshi's works by quoting "Beautiful performance by Mohan Joshi and Suhas Joshi are the highlights of the film."

Apart from her wide long theater and films career, Joshi was also seen in Marathi as well as Hindi television shows. As of 2012, she is seen in the Hindi TV show Khamoshiyaan that airs on Star Plus.

Personal life
Joshi has done her Bachelor of Arts from the University of Pune in the subjects Philosophy, Psychology and Sanskrit language. She is also trained in classical music and has given four examinations (Madhyama) of Gandharva Mahavidyalaya. She is married to Subhash Joshi, who is also a theater artist. She has 2 kids, Sonali Joshi and Saket Joshi.

Selected filmography

Films

Theater

Television

Awards
For her performance in the film Tu Tithe Mee, Joshi was presented with Filmfare Award in the Best Actress in Marathi film category. For the same film and in the same category, she also received the Screen Award in 1999. In 2011, Joshi also received a "Ganga-Jamuna Award" for her works in the Marathi theater. The award is presented jointly by Thane Municipal Corporation and P Sawalaram Smriti Samiti (PSSS). She was awarded the Sangeet Natak Akademi Award for 2018 for Acting.

References

External links 
 

Actresses in Marathi cinema
Filmfare Awards winners
Actresses in Hindi cinema
Indian television actresses
Actresses in Marathi theatre
Savitribai Phule Pune University alumni
National School of Drama alumni
Indian soap opera actresses
Living people
People from Thane
Actresses from Maharashtra
20th-century Indian actresses
21st-century Indian actresses
Indian stage actresses
Actresses in Marathi television
Actresses in Hindi television
1947 births
Recipients of the Sangeet Natak Akademi Award